Grégoire M'Bida Abéga (born 27 January 1952), nicknamed Arantes, is a Cameroonian former professional footballer who played as an attacking midfielder. He competed for the Cameroon national team at the 1982 FIFA World Cup.

Career
M'Bida was born in Yaoundé. He played for Canon Yaoundé (1975–1982), SC Bastia (1982–1984), Angers SCO (1984–1985), USL Dunkerque (1985–1986), Thonon-les-Bains (1986–1987) and CS Sedan Ardennes (1987–1989).

He played all minutes for Cameroon in the 1982 FIFA World Cup and also scored the only goal for Cameroon in the competition. The goal was scored 63 minutes into the match against Italy, only one minute after Francesco Graziani had scored for Italy. The game ended in a draw, 1–1.

See also
1982 FIFA World Cup squads

References

External links
 
 Player website

1952 births
Living people
Footballers from Yaoundé
Association football midfielders
Cameroonian footballers
Cameroon international footballers
Canon Yaoundé players
SC Bastia players
Angers SCO players
USL Dunkerque players
Thonon Evian Grand Genève F.C. players
CS Sedan Ardennes players
Ligue 1 players
Ligue 2 players
1982 FIFA World Cup players
1982 African Cup of Nations players
1984 African Cup of Nations players
1986 African Cup of Nations players
Africa Cup of Nations-winning players
Cameroonian expatriate footballers
Cameroonian expatriate sportspeople in France
Expatriate footballers in France
Expatriate footballers in Luxembourg
Alliance Dudelange players